Kevin Lynton Dixon (born 27 July 1960) is an English former professional footballer who played as a striker in the Football League for Carlisle United, Hartlepool United, Scunthorpe United, York City and Scarborough and in non-League football for Annfield Plain, Tow Law Town, Newcastle Blue Star, Gateshead and Hebburn.

References

1960 births
Living people
Sportspeople from Consett
Footballers from County Durham
English footballers
Association football forwards
Annfield Plain F.C. players
Tow Law Town F.C. players
Carlisle United F.C. players
Hartlepool United F.C. players
Scunthorpe United F.C. players
York City F.C. players
Scarborough F.C. players
Newcastle Blue Star F.C. players
Gateshead F.C. players
Hebburn Town F.C. players
English Football League players
National League (English football) players